"" is a German word for outer ward or outer bailey. It represents an open kill zone area between two defensive walls that is used for defensive purposes. s were built in the post-classical and early modern periods to improve the defence of castles and town walls. Essenwein states that the "main purpose of this feature was so that the besieging force could not reach the actual castle wall very easily with battering rams or belfries, but had to stop at the lower, outer wall; also that two ranks of archers, behind and above one another, could fire upon the approaching enemy".

Castles 
The  of a castle is sited in front of the main curtain wall and is enclosed on the outer side by a second, lower wall, known as the  wall. Further progress was thus seriously impeded.

In central Europe most  were built in front of older castle walls as a later addition and reinforcement of the defences.

Town fortifications 
The  in front of a town gate is a fortified area between the main gate and the outer gate of a medieval town gateway system. Town gates were often built in the shape of a gate tower, with a second, and sometimes even a third, gate in front of it (so-called double or triple gate systems). In front of the town walls in the area of the town gates there was usually a second wall in which the outer gate was located. An enemy who had breached the outer gate and penetrated the  would find himself in an enclosed area with very little scope to exploit his initial success.

The barbican is based on a similar concept to the gateway  and is found in front of the main wall but separated from it by an additional moat.

In the Hussite period (around 1420/30) impressive examples were built that were mainly intended as protection against early firearms.

As their defensive function became superfluous, in many cases barns, stables and storage buildings were erected in s.

The Zwinger at Dresden inherited its name from the old  in front of the Crown Gate on the outer wall of the fortress. It was never intended as a fortification, however, but was conceived as the outer courtyard of a new palace.

Development 

The development of the  has not been well researched to date. By the fifth century A.D. a fully developed  had been built in front of the Byzantine walls of Constantinople.

In early medieval fortifications, too, a succession of defensive walls can be seen. Especially during the time of the Hungarian invasions, defensive castles were protected by berms and outer ramparts to guard against the cavalry attacks of the Magyars. These were not  in the true sense of the word; often an intermediate moat separated the lines of defence. Such a moat is also frequently part of late medieval .

These fortification elements do not have any direct successors, however.

In central Europe  first reappeared in the first half of the 13th century in front of the ring-walls of small fortifications. Towards the end of that century, the defensive capability of castles was being enhanced in this way far more frequently, for example at Gnandstein Castle in Saxony; Château du Landsberg and Château d'Andlau in Alsace. In southern France the heavily restored  in the town fortifications of Carcassonne appears to have been built. Initially  walls were very close to the main wall.

Countless examples were built, especially during the 15th and 16th centuries. In Franconia the fortification of late medieval city has largely survived. In Nuremberg a low  was built in front of the older ring-wall. In the early 15th century, Munich was fitted with a new double ring of town walls, as depicted in the Nuremberg Chronicle. By connecting the inner and the outer ring – to be more exactly, the respective inner and outer (= lower) watch towers – with numerous party walls, a succession of zwinger segments soon encircled the place as a whole.

The first  walls of the High Middle Ages were usually not protected by towers. The artillery fortifications of the Late Middle Ages, by contrast, were defended by numerous flanking and, sometimes also, battery towers or roundels.

The  of a small group of castles in the Franconian Haßberge date to the Hussite period. As elsewhere the territorial lords were reacting to the serious threat of rebels from nearby Bohemia. These  at the castles of Altenstein, Rauheneck and Schmachtenberg have been well preserved. At Rauheneck Castle the defences are further strengthened by two bretèches. These features and hoardings may also be seen as part of other .

The Hussite period additions of many castles in the endangered regions often went back to innovations that had been developed by the Hussites themselves. A prime example is the town fortification of the south Bohemian Hussite town of Tábor.

In general the  walls were markedly lower and less thick that the actual ring walls. Occasionally a covered or open wall walk was built on the inside of the wall, as at Trausnitz Castle in Landshut. Even underground wall walks with embrasures for hand guns may be seen, for example, at Hochhaus Castle near Nördlingen.

 walls could fully surround a fortification or just a particularly vulnerable section. There is often a moat in front of them, the  wall also acting as the revetment of the moat. On hillside castles the  wall was a supporting wall and often very high to provide static stability of the whole site.

Frequently, small, hidden sally ports or posterns enabled direct combat with an enemy in the moat area. The actual  area was also often accessible through sally ports.

Early high medieval  in the Holy Land 

The Krak des Chevaliers of the Knights of St. John is generally classified as a crusader castle. Just before 1170 the first small  was built here around the inner ward. This surprisingly early  was replaced in the mid-13th century by the present outer fortification. This  is also one of the oldest examples of its type. The  of the Krak des Chevaliers was extended in around 1270. Despite this reinforcement, the Muslims under Sultan Baibars I succeeded in capturing the fort in 1271, after just a four-week siege.

Other large crusader castles were also surrounded by great  systems. By shortly before 1168 the Knights of St. John began remodelling Belvoir Castle in present-day Israel. The outer fortification with its corner towers acts like "a large  to the structure" (U. Großmann).

13th-century double concentric walls in Wales 

The Welsh castles of Harlech and Beaumaris (started 1295 but never completed) have a double defensive wall, the outer wing surrounding the inner one concentrically at a short distance from it.

Examples of surviving medieval

Town and city fortifications 
Amberg
Aschersleben
Carcassonne
Delitzsch
Dinkelsbühl
Ingelheim
Jihlava
Jüterbog
Neubrandenburg
Nördlingen
Nuremberg
Templin
Warsaw
Wolframs-Eschenbach

Castles 
Altenstein Castle (Hassberge)
Burghausen Castle (Burghausen/Salzach, Upper Bavaria)
Giechburg (Upper Franconia)
Guttenberg Castle on the Neckar (Neckar-Odenwald-Kreis)
Hohenurach Castle (Swabian Jura)
Hornberg Castle on the Neckar (Neckar-Odenwald-Kreis)
Löwenstein Castle (Swabian-Franconian Hills)
Minneburg (Odenwald)
Nürburg Castle (Eifel)
Otzberg Fortress (Otzberg)
Rauheneck Castle (Ebern)
Turaida Castle (Turaida)
Tower of London (London)

See also 
Zingel

Footnotes

References

Literature 
 Ettel, Peter, Anne-Marie Flambard Héricher and T. E. McNeill, eds. (2002).  in Chateau Gaillard 21. Caen: Crahm.
 Thomas Biller. . Deutscher Kunstverlag, Munich, 1993, .
 Horst Wolfgang Böhme (ed.):  Vol. 1:  Deutschen Castlesvereinigung e.V. Theiss, Stuttgart, 1999, .
 Horst Wolfgang Böhme, Reinhard Friedrich, Barbara Schock-Werner (ed.). . Reclam, Stuttgart, 2004, .
 Georg Ulrich Großmann. . Schnell & Steiner, Regensburg, 2005, .
 Michael Losse. . Regionalia, Euskirchen, 2011, .

Castle architecture